The 2012–13 Bulgarian Hockey League season was the 61st season of the Bulgarian Hockey League, the top level of ice hockey in Bulgaria. Four teams participated in the league, and HC CSKA Sofia won the championship, their first since 1986.

Regular season

External links
 Season on eurohockey.com

Bulgarian Hockey League seasons
Bul
Bulg